Pardies is a commune in the Pyrénées-Atlantiques department in south-western France.

Geography

Neighbouring communes
North-East: Artix 
North-West: Os-Marsillon 
East: Bésingrand 
West: Noguères
South-East: Parbayse 
South-West: Lahourcade 
South: Monein

History

Administration
List of successive mayors of Pardies

See also
Communes of the Pyrénées-Atlantiques department

References

Communes of Pyrénées-Atlantiques